Renewal theologians are those theologians who represent the Pentecostal, Charismatic and Neocharismatic movements. Notable Renewal theologians are noted under the grouping with which they are most closely identified.

Pentecostal theologians 
Gordon Fee - Assemblies of God
Simon Chan - Assemblies of God
Stanley M. Horton - Assemblies of God
Cheryl Bridges Johns - Church of God (Cleveland)
Jackie David Johns - Church of God (Cleveland)
Rufus Hollis Gause - Church of God (Cleveland)
Steven Jack Land - Church of God (Cleveland)
French L. Arrington - Church of God (Cleveland)
Estrelda Alexander - Church of God (Cleveland)
Harold D. Hunter - International Pentecostal Holiness Church
John Harris - Church of God/Church of the Redeemer
James A. Forbes United Holy Church of America/American Baptist Churches, USA
Donald Gee
Nimi Wariboko - Redeemed Christian Church of God
Amos Yong - Assemblies of God
Frank Macchia - Assemblies of God
Terry Cross - Church of God (Cleveland)
Raiford Doc Hughes III - Church of God (Cleveland)
Verna M. Linzey - Assemblies of God
Russell P. Spittler - Assemblies of God
Wolfgang Vondey - Church of God (Cleveland)
Clifton R. Clarke - Church of God(Cleveland)
Kenneth Archer - Church of God(Cleveland)
Daniela C. Augustine- Church of God(Cleveland)

Pentecostal Biblical scholars 

Marcel V. Măcelaru - Christian Pentecostal Denomination (Romania)
Robert P. Menzies - Assemblies of God
Rickie D. Moore - Church of God (Cleveland)
Roger J. Stronstad - Pentecostal Assemblies of Canada)
John Christopher Thomas - Church of God (Cleveland)

Pentecostal historians 

H. Vinson Synan - International Pentecostal Holiness Church
Kimberly Ervin Alexander - Church of God (Cleveland)

 David Roebuck - Church of God Cleveland TN
 Gary W. Garrett - Apostolic Archives
 Bernie L. Wade - International Circle of Faith (ICOF)
 Cecil M. Robeck - Assemblies of God
 Connie Au - Charismatic Renewal Movement

Charismatic theologians 
J. Rodman Williams
David Pawson
Derek Prince

Neocharismatic Biblical scholars
Graham Twelftree - Vineyard movement

Neocharismatic theologians 
Wayne Grudem
Jack Deere
C. Peter Wagner
Guy Chevreau
Charles H. Kraft
Michael L. Brown

Charismatic and Pentecostal Christianity